Sick Town Derby Dames (STDD) is a women's flat track roller derby league based in Corvallis, Oregon. Founded in 2008, the league consists of a single team which competes against teams from other leagues. Sick Town is a member of the Women's Flat Track Derby Association (WFTDA).

History
The league was founded by Brick Wallace and Magic Hips, two skaters with the Emerald City Roller Girls who wanted a league closer to their home town.  It played its first home bout in September 2009, against the Lava City Roller Dolls.

Sick Town accepted into the Women's Flat Track Derby Association Apprentice Program in December 2009.  By early 2012, it had enough skaters to host an intraleague bout, and in June 2012 it was accepted as a full member of the WFTDA.

In 2013, the league purchased the Lake Park Roller Rink in Lewisburg, the third-oldest roller rink in the Pacific Northwest. Sick Town planned to use the building as a practice rink, but shortly afterwards the facility was declared unsafe by the local fire marshal, leading to lengthy and costly restoration efforts. Membership dropped off during a lengthy hiatus, and in October 2017 the league played its first home game in three years, at the Linn County Fair and Expo Grounds in Albany.

In September 2016, league member Miranda "Dixieskullpopper" Prince gained local news coverage for appearing on the game show Jeopardy!.

WFTDA rankings

NR = no final ranking assigned this year

References

Roller derby leagues established in 2008
Roller derby leagues in Oregon
Corvallis, Oregon
Women's Flat Track Derby Association Division 3
2008 establishments in Oregon